Kenneth Jensen (born 14 October 1969) is a Danish former footballer.

Club career
Jensen is mostly remembered for being part of the Herfølge team that surprisingly won the 1999–2000 Danish Superliga. That season he was topscorer for the club and scored goal of the year as well.

Jensen retired in 2004, after avoiding relegation from the Danish Superliga with Herfølge. Before his move to the club in 1999, he played for FC Copenhagen, OB, B 1909, B 1913 and OKS. Jensen mainly played as a left winger during his career, which was plagued by injuries.

References

1969 births
Living people
Danish men's footballers
Odense Boldklub players
F.C. Copenhagen players
Herfølge Boldklub players
Danish Superliga players
Association football forwards
Boldklubben 1913 players